The Menace to Carlotta is a 1914 American silent short drama film directed by Allan Dwan and featuring Pauline Bush, William C. Dowlan, Murdock MacQuarrie and Lon Chaney. It was banned by the censor of Quebec on March 19, 1914. The film is now considered lost. Chaney also wrote the film's scenario (his first known screenwriting credit).  The film's original working title was Carlotta, the Bead Stringer.

Plot
Carlotta's fiancé Giovanni Bartholdi (Chaney) loses his money gambling with a shady character called "The Vulture" and, now penniless, moves in with Carlotta and her father and brother Tony. The Vulture talks Giovanni into luring Carlotta to a lonely dive one night, where she is to be kidnapped and sold into the white slave trade. She is saved however by her father and brother.

Cast
 Lon Chaney as Giovanni Bartholdi
 Pauline Bush as Carlotta
 William C. Dowlan as Carlotta's brother, Tony
 Murdock MacQuarrie as Carlotta's father
 John Burton as The Vulture

Reception
"Motion Picture News" wrote "The fight between Giovanni and the old father is very realistic, almost too much so." "Moving Picture World" wrote ""A one-reel (sic) offering by Lou (sic) Chaney, who plays the villain's part...The Italian characterizations are good and the setting's in keeping...The photography is fair." (Note the review refers to the film as a "one-reel offering", while reference sources list it as two reels in length. The same reviewer however also misspelled Chaney's first name).

References

External links

1914 films
1914 drama films
1914 short films
Silent American drama films
American silent short films
American black-and-white films
Films directed by Allan Dwan
Lost American films
Universal Pictures short films
1914 lost films
Lost drama films
1910s American films